Hernando de Santana (born in the 1510s, Zafra, Badajoz Province, Spain - year of death unknown) was a Spanish conquistador, founder of the city of Valledupar on January 6, 1550, and conqueror in what is now northern Colombia.

See also 

List of conquistadors in Colombia
Spanish conquest of the Chibchan Nations
Chimila people

References 

1510s births
Year of birth uncertain
Year of death unknown
Spanish conquistadors
Extremaduran conquistadors
History of Colombia